Sams Publishing is dedicated to the publishing of technical training manuals and is an imprint of Pearson plc, the global publishing and education company.

Sams Publishing was founded in 1946 by Howard W. Sams, originally producing radio schematics and repair manuals. It was acquired by ITT in 1967. ITT sold its publishing division in 1985 to Macmillan. In 1987, Sams was split into three divisions with the computer book division transferred to what later became Macmillan Computer Publishing.  
Macmillan sold its computer publishing to Simon & Schuster in 1991. Simon & Schuster later sold its education division to the imprint's current owner, Pearson.

The computer books division is notable for its "Teach Yourself", "Unleashed" and "21 days" book series.

References

Further reading 
 Careers: Interviews, A Look at the Publishing World Network Professional Association. 2003.

External links 
 Sams Publishing

Educational publishing companies of the United States
Educational book publishing companies
Computer book publishing companies
Companies based in Indiana
Publishing companies established in 1946
American companies established in 1946
Pearson plc